Joyland: A hub for short fiction is a digital platform and print literary journal now known as Joyland Magazine. It was created in 2008 by novelist Emily Schultz and filmmaker Brian Joseph Davis. Though based in New York, Joyland Magazine's structure is distributed across North American cities and regions with an editorial network. Notable contributors have included Jonathan Lethem, Lydia Millet, and Chris Kraus. It was an early publisher to authors Amelia Gray, Roxane Gay, Rachel Khong, and Ottessa Moshfegh.

In 2016 Joyland Magazine was merged with Schultz and Davis's Heroic Collective Media, and new publishers, Kyle Lucia Wu and Lisa Locascio, were hired to oversee editorial and development. Since then Joyland Magazine has founded the "Bad Women" panel series for female writers and filmmakers, and its stories and authors have been profiled by Huffington Post and Lenny Letter. Joyland Magazine has also launched an annual fiction prize called the Open Border Fiction Prize. Amelia Gray judged the prize in 2017, Rachel Khong in 2018.

References

External links
 

Literary magazines published in the United States
Magazines established in 2008
Magazines published in New York City
American literature websites
Online magazines published in the United States